"I Don't Want to Set the World on Fire" is a pop song written by Bennie Benjamin, Eddie Durham, Sol Marcus and Eddie Seiler.

It was written in 1938, but was first recorded three years later by Harlan Leonard and His Rockets. It was covered by several musicians and groups, most successfully by Horace Heidt on Columbia Records, whose version reached number one on the US pop chart; and by The Ink Spots on Decca, whose version reached number four on the same listing.  Other early versions included those by Tommy Tucker, Mitchell Ayres, and (in Britain) Vera Lynn. The song, with its lyrics starting with "I don't want to set the world on fire/ I just want to start a flame in your heart..." became especially popular after the attack on Pearl Harbor in December 1941.

The song was later recorded by Betty Carter, Frankie Laine, Brian Hyland, Anthony Newley, Suzy Bogguss and others. It has also become synonymous with the open-world adventure video game series Fallout. The song is briefly used in season 5 of ABC's Once Upon a Time.

In popular culture
The Ink Spots' 1941 version is featured in the Bethesda Softworks video games Fallout 3, Fallout 4 and Fallout 76 on the in-game radio.

Samples 
This song was quietly sampled by thrash metal band Megadeth on their song "Set the World Afire" on their 1988 studio album So Far, So Good... So What!

References

1938 songs
1941 singles
Songs written by Bennie Benjamin
Songs written by Sol Marcus
The Ink Spots songs